Scooby-Doo! Abracadabra-Doo is a 2010 direct-to-DVD animated comedy horror mystery fantasy film, and the fourteenth entry in a series of direct-to-video animated films based upon the Scooby-Doo Saturday morning cartoons. The film is directed by Spike Brandt and Tony Cervone. It was produced in 2009 by Warner Bros. Animation and it was released on February 16, 2010. It made its television debut on July 10, 2010 on Cartoon Network The film performed well on iTunes, reaching the Top 10 on the Kids & Family film charts and the Top 40 on the iTunes film charts.  The DVD sold 61,341 units in its first week and as of January 2013, it has sold approximately 433,000 units.

This marks the first Scooby-Doo animated film to feature Matthew Lillard voicing Shaggy Rogers (having previously played the character in the 2002 and 2004 live-action films), as well as the first Scooby-Doo production since Scooby-Doo and the Cyber Chase not to feature original Shaggy voice actor Casey Kasem in any capacity. This marked the final acting role of John Stephenson before his death in 2015.

The animation is now in a different format, with a darker, more realistic look similar to Zombie Island and Witch's Ghost, and the characters are now in their original outfits and designs from the Where Are You! series.

Plot

After wrapping up their latest mystery, Velma gets a call from her mother asking she check on her younger sister Madelyn, who attends a college for magicians. The gang heads to the Whirlen Merlin Magic Academy, located in an old Irish castle. Once they reach the castle they meet the owner, Whirlen Merlin, along with his brother Marlon, who acts as cook and butler, and Crystal, Whirlen's former stage assistant. The gang learns a giant griffin has been scaring away the students and staff.

Later that evening, Madelyn, who has had a crush on Shaggy for years, takes him on a romantic walk to in the gardens and show him an ancient sun-dial. Madelyn explains the gryphon was meant to protect the school, but then the gryphon chases them from the garden. The rest of the students leave, so the gang starts taking classes themselves. Meanwhile, Calvin Curdles, a powerful ice-cream guru, continually offers to buy Whirlen's castle from him. The gang promises to investigate to see if Curdles is behind the Gryphon.

Velma and Daphne stumble on a secret passageway leading to the attic of the school, where they discover Alma Rumblebuns, the school's head maid, used to date Calvin Curdles. Meanwhile, Shaggy and Scooby discover the special effects room of the castle, where they are discovered by Ms. Rumblebuns and knock over some chemicals, creating a fog. Madelyn then finds a book about the ancient staff of O'Flannery, the original owner of the castle, which is said to control the gryphon. Even though Amos warns them the island where the staff rests is haunted by a Banshee, the gang travels to O'Flannery's crypt and recover the staff, but they are chased away by the Banshee and narrowly escape.

Afterwards, the gryphon quickly appears again. As the gang runs to the castle, Shaggy and Madelyn bump into Amos and misplace the staff with Amos' pitchfork. When Madelyn runs outside to recover the staff, she is kidnapped by the gryphon. Meanwhile, the gang finds out that Amos has been secretly working for Calvin Curdles to try to get Whirlen to sell the castle. While the gang goes to rescue Madelyn, Calvin tries to convince Whirlen to sign over the castle.

They get into the tower with the staff, but they are separated in the process when the gryphon attacks. Shaggy and Scooby are left alone while the others get help, and Shaggy discovers the staff is a key to the roost where they rescue Madelyn. But, their reunion is quickly cut short again when the gryphon attacks, but they are able to escape. Shaggy also throws the staff at the gryphon during the process, causing it to go out of control. Everybody else rushes outside including Curdles. The gryphon crashes to the ground, where they discover it is actually a giant puppet, controlled from a blimp hidden by a fog machine run by Whirlen's brother Marlon. He had discovered Lord O'Flannery had mechanical devices imitating a gryphon's beak and talons hidden in the Gryphon's Roost, hoping it would make everyone think a real gryphon lived there. Marlon fixed them, and used the devices to scare trespassers away. He was also behind the banshee, which was only a hologram.

Tired of doing all the real work but getting none of the credit, Marlon decided to use his puppets and illusions to become a famous magician himself, but he needed money to start and the only way was to get Whirlen to sell the castle. So, Marlon had his gryphon puppet scare everyone away. He apologizes for trying to make Whirlen fail, knowing how much the school meant to him, not wanting to take away his dream. Whirlen forgives Marlon, and all is well. Velma reveals Amos found Marlon rebuilding the Gryphon and told Curdles about it. Curdles reveals he wanted to buy the castle to win back Alma's heart.

Alma accepts him back and they become a couple again. The Merlin brothers decide to make Madelyn their apprentice and soon after Calvin Curdles sponsors the reopening of the Merlin Brothers' Academy of Magic, where Madelyn performs with Daphne Blake acting as her assistant.

Voice cast
 Frank Welker as Fred Jones and Scooby-Doo
 Matthew Lillard as Shaggy Rogers
 Grey DeLisle as Daphne Blake
 Mindy Cohn as Velma Dinkley
 Danica McKellar as Madelyn Dinkley
 James Patrick Stuart as Whirlen Merlin
 Brian Posehn as Marlon Merlin
 Diane Delano as Alma Rumblebuns 
 Jeffrey Tambor as Calvin Curdles
 Crystal Scales as Crystal
 John DiMaggio as Amos
 Dave Attell as G.P.S.
 Olivia Hack as Treena
 Dee Bradley Baker as Sherman
 Melique Berger as Maxwell's Mother
 John Stephenson as Sheriff

EP
An EP soundtrack was released exclusively to iTunes Stores in the U.S. on September 14, 2010.
 "Scooby Abracadabra-Doo" - 2:11
 "Magic" - 2:06
 "Tomorrow" - 2:13

References

External links
 

2010 films
Scooby-Doo direct-to-video animated films
2010 animated films
Warner Bros. direct-to-video animated films
2010s American animated films
Films directed by Spike Brandt
Films with screenplays by Paul Dini
Films directed by Tony Cervone
American children's animated comedy films
American children's animated mystery films
Animated films based on Celtic mythology
Films set in castles
2010s children's animated films
2010s English-language films
Films with screenplays by Alan Burnett